Podlonk is a settlement in the Municipality of Železniki in the Upper Carniola region of Slovenia.

Name
The name Podlonk is a fused prepositional phrase that has lost case inflection: pod 'below' + Lonk, referring to Lonk Hill (elevation ) immediately east of the village. The settlement was known as Podlong in German.

References

External links

Podlonk at Geopedia

Populated places in the Municipality of Železniki